Qullpani (Aymara qullpa saltpeter, -ni a suffix, "the one with saltpeter", also spelled Kollpani) is a mountain in the Bolivian Andes which reaches a height of approximately . It is located in the La Paz Department, Loayza Province, Luribay Municipality, northeast of Luribay.

References 

Mountains of La Paz Department (Bolivia)